The 2014–15 season was Lille OSC's 71st season in existence and the club's 15th consecutive season in the top flight of French football.

After a season without any European competition, the club, which finished third in last season, participated in the UEFA Champions League, starting in the third qualifying round, before being eliminated by Porto in the play-off round. As the club were eliminated, they earned a place in the UEFA Europa League group stage. In addition to the European competition, LOSC participated in domestic competitions (Ligue 1, Coupe de France and Coupe de la Ligue).

Players

Squad

Source:

Transfers in

Transfers out

Statistics

Appearances and goals

Last updated: 23 May 2015
Source: Match reports in Competitive matches, Ligue1.com

Goalscorers

Last updated:  23 May 2015
Source: Match reports in Competitive matches, ESPN

Disciplinary record

Pre-season and friendlies

Competitions

Ligue 1

League table

Results summary

Results by round

Matches

Coupe de la Ligue

Coupe de France

UEFA Champions League

Third qualifying round

Play-off round

UEFA Europa League

Group stage

References

Lille OSC seasons
Lille OSC